Glenn Healy (born August 23, 1962) is a Canadian former ice hockey goaltender who played for 15 years in the National Hockey League. Prior to that, he was a member of the Western Michigan University hockey team, and 1985 graduate of the school. He also served as the director of player affairs for the National Hockey League Players' Association (NHLPA). He resigned on September 3, 2009 in the wake of the firing of NHLPA Executive Director Paul Kelly. In his capacity as director of player affairs, Healy also served as a non-voting member on the National Hockey League (NHL) Competition Committee, overseeing the NHLPA's interests regarding rule and equipment issues and player safety matters. He now is the Executive Director/President of the NHL Alumni Association.

Biography

Playing career
During his career, Healy played for the Los Angeles Kings, New York Islanders, New York Rangers and the Toronto Maple Leafs. During the 1992–93 season, he helped lead an up-start New York Islander team to the Wales Conference Finals, shocking the two-time defending Stanley Cup Champion Pittsburgh Penguins along the way. In the 1993 off-season, the Islanders lost Healy to the Mighty Ducks of Anaheim in the expansion draft. The next day, he was claimed by the Tampa Bay Lightning in phase two of the draft. The very same day Healy was traded to the New York Rangers for a third round pick. Healy was a part of the Rangers' Stanley Cup winning team in 1993-94, and he played 68 playoff minutes that year. During the 1995–96 season, Healy won both the Rangers Good Guy Award and the Rangers Fan Club Ceil Saidel Award. At the time he won these awards, he was the Rangers' number-one goalie while Mike Richter was injured. Healy appeared on three video game covers during his career, his first being Electronic Arts' NHL Hockey in 1991, then in Jaleco's Pro Sport Hockey  and later Sega's NHL All-Star Hockey '95, both for the Sega Genesis (Healy also appeared on the cover of the Game Gear release of NHL All-Star Hockey). Healy and Wayne Gretzky are the only two players to appear on at least three different video game franchise's covers (Healy is playing for a different team in all three covers).

Broadcasting career
After his long playing career he served as hockey colour commentator and studio analyst, first for the CBC and then for TSN. He also served as the secondary colour commentator for TSN Hockey and as an "Inside-the-Glass" reporter for TSN's regional Toronto Maple Leafs telecasts. At the start of the 2009–10 NHL season, he moved back to analyzing games for CBC's Hockey Night in Canada before he joined the NHL on Sportsnet crew in 2014.

Healy created the "Loch Ness Monster" hockey analysis segment for TSN, in which he picked a player (or players) who was supposed to be a key player that night but did not turn out to be (the tagline being that the player is "the monster you hear about but don't see"). Bagpipes can be heard in the background and the chosen player is dubbed "tonight's Nessie". One notable occurrence was the March 29, 2008, broadcast of the Boston Bruins' 4-0 win over the Ottawa Senators, where Healy selected the entire Senators team that night as the "Nessie". The segment's title is a parody of fellow analyst Pierre McGuire's "Monster" segment, which focuses on a player's whose contributions have been particularly effective.

Healy was also a colour analyst for the 2007 Casino Rama Curling Skins Game finals on TSN.

In June 2016, Rogers Media announced that Healy would be among the eight cut from Hockey Night in Canada.

Career statistics

Regular season and playoffs

Awards and honours

References

External links

1962 births
Canadian colour commentators
Canadian television sportscasters
Chicago Wolves players
Curling broadcasters
Ice hockey people from Ontario
Living people
Los Angeles Kings players
National Hockey League broadcasters
New York Islanders players
New York Rangers players
People from Pickering, Ontario
Stanley Cup champions
Toronto Maple Leafs players
Undrafted National Hockey League players
Western Michigan Broncos men's ice hockey players
Canadian ice hockey goaltenders
AHCA Division I men's ice hockey All-Americans